Tansyaster is a common name for several closely related plants and may refer to:

Dieteria
Machaeranthera
Psilactis
Rayjacksonia